The Japanese men's national under-20 ice hockey team ( Aisuhokkē Danshi U-20 Nippon Daihyō) represents Japan at the International Ice Hockey Federation's World Junior Hockey Championship Division I.

Ice hockey teams in Japan
Junior national ice hockey teams
Ice hockey
Ice hockey